Elena López Benaches (born 4 October 1994 in Valencia) is a Spanish group rhythmic gymnast.

Career 
She represents her nation at international competitions. She participated at the 2012 Summer Olympics and ended on 4th place in Group All-Around. She also competed at world championships, including at the 2015 World Rhythmic Gymnastics Championships where she won the bronze medal in the all-around event.

López competed at the 2016 Summer Olympics in Rio de Janeiro, Brazil where she was member of the Spanish group (together with Sandra Aguilar, Artemi Gavezou, Lourdes Mohedano, Alejandra Quereda) that won silver medal in group-all around.

Detailed Olympic results

References

External links
https://gymnastics.sport/site/athletes/bio_detail.php?id=
 
 
 
 BBC
 Getty images
 YouTube

1994 births
Living people
Spanish rhythmic gymnasts
Place of birth missing (living people)
Gymnasts at the 2012 Summer Olympics
Olympic gymnasts of Spain
Gymnasts at the 2015 European Games
European Games competitors for Spain
Medalists at the Rhythmic Gymnastics World Championships
Medalists at the Rhythmic Gymnastics European Championships
Olympic silver medalists for Spain